The 60th United States Congress was a meeting of the legislative branch of the United States federal government, composed of the United States Senate and the United States House of Representatives. It met in Washington, DC from March 4, 1907, to March 4, 1909, during the last two years of Theodore Roosevelt's presidency. The apportionment of seats in the House of Representatives was based on the 1900 United States census. Both chambers had a Republican majority.

Major events

Major legislation

 May 30, 1908 — Aldrich-Vreeland Act, ch. 229, 
 1908 — The Federal Employers Liability Act (FELA), 5645 U.S.C. § 51 et seq.

States admitted 
 November 16, 1907: Oklahoma was admitted as the 46th state.

Party summary

Senate

House of Representatives

Leadership

Senate
 President: Charles W. Fairbanks (R)
 President pro tempore: William P. Frye (R)

Majority (Republican) leadership
 Conference Chairman: William B. Allison until August 1908
 Eugene Hale from December 1908

Minority (Democratic) leadership
 Caucus chairman: Charles A. Culberson
 Conference secretary: Robert L. Owen

House of Representatives
Speaker: Joseph G. Cannon (R)

Majority (Republican) leadership
Majority Leader: Sereno E. Payne
Majority Whip: James E. Watson
 Republican Conference Chair: William Peters Hepburn

Minority (Democratic) leadership
Minority Leader: John Sharp Williams until 1908
 Champ Clark, from 1908
Minority Whip: James T. Lloyd until 1908; vacant thereafter
 Caucus Chairman: Henry D. Clayton
 Democratic Campaign Committee Chairman: James M. Griggs

Members
Skip to House of Representatives, below

Senate

At this time, Senators were elected by the state legislatures every two years, with one-third beginning new six-year terms with each Congress. Preceding the names in the list below are Senate class numbers, which indicate the cycle of their election, In this Congress, Class 3 meant their term ended with this Congress, requiring reelection in 1908; Class 1 meant their term began in the last Congress, requiring reelection in 1910; and Class 2 meant their term began in this Congress, requiring reelection in 1912.

Alabama
 2. John T. Morgan (D), until June 11, 1907
 John H. Bankhead (D), from June 18, 1907
 3. Edmund Pettus (D), until July 27, 1907
 Joseph F. Johnston (D), from August 8, 1907

Arkansas
 2. Jeff Davis (D)
 3. James P. Clarke (D)

California
 1. Frank P. Flint (R)
 3. George C. Perkins (R)

Colorado
 2. Simon Guggenheim (R)
 3. Henry M. Teller (D)

Connecticut
 1. Morgan Bulkeley (R)
 3. Frank B. Brandegee (R)

Delaware
 1. Henry A. du Pont (R)
 2. Harry A. Richardson (R)

Florida
 1. James Taliaferro (D)
 3. Stephen Mallory (D), until December 23, 1907
 William J. Bryan (D), December 27, 1907 – March 22, 1908
 William Hall Milton (D), from March 27, 1908

Georgia
 2. Augustus O. Bacon (D)
 3. Alexander S. Clay (D)

Idaho
 2. William E. Borah (R)
 3. Weldon B. Heyburn (R)

Illinois
 2. Shelby M. Cullom (R)
 3. Albert J. Hopkins (R)

Indiana
 1. Albert J. Beveridge (R)
 3. James A. Hemenway (R)

Iowa
 2. Jonathan P. Dolliver (R)
 3. William B. Allison (R), until August 4, 1908
 Albert B. Cummins (R), from November 24, 1908

Kansas
 2. Charles Curtis (R)
 3. Chester I. Long (R)

Kentucky
 2. Thomas H. Paynter (D)
 3. James B. McCreary (D)

Louisiana
 2. Murphy J. Foster (D)
 3. Samuel D. McEnery (D)

Maine
 1. Eugene Hale (R)
 2. William P. Frye (R)

Maryland
 1. Isidor Rayner (D)
 3. William P. Whyte (D), until March 17, 1908
 John W. Smith (D), from March 25, 1908

Massachusetts
 1. Henry Cabot Lodge (R)
 2: Winthrop M. Crane (R)

Michigan
 1. Julius C. Burrows (R)
 2. William A. Smith (R)

Minnesota
 1. Moses E. Clapp (R)
 2. Knute Nelson (R)

Mississippi
 1. Hernando D. Money (D)
 2. Anselm J. McLaurin (D)

Missouri
 1. William Warner (R)
 3. William J. Stone (D)

Montana
 1. Thomas H. Carter (R)
 2. Joseph M. Dixon (R)

Nebraska
 1. Elmer J. Burkett (R)
 2. Norris Brown (R)

Nevada
 1. George S. Nixon (R)
 3. Francis G. Newlands (D)

New Hampshire
 2. Henry E. Burnham (R)
 3. Jacob H. Gallinger (R)

New Jersey
 1. John Kean (R)
 2. Frank O. Briggs (R)

New York
 1. Chauncey M. Depew (R)
 3. Thomas C. Platt (R)

North Carolina
 2. Furnifold M. Simmons (D)
 3. Lee S. Overman (D)

North Dakota
 1. Porter J. McCumber (R)
 3. Henry C. Hansbrough (R)

Ohio
 1: Charles W. F. Dick (R)
 3. Joseph B. Foraker (R)

Oklahoma
 2. Robert L. Owen (D), from December 11, 1907
 3. Thomas P. Gore (D), from December 11, 1907

Oregon
 2. Jonathan Bourne Jr. (R)
 3. Charles W. Fulton (R)

Pennsylvania
 1. Philander C. Knox (R)
 3. Boies Penrose (R)

Rhode Island
 1. Nelson W. Aldrich (R)
 2. George P. Wetmore (R), from January 22, 1908

South Carolina
 2. Benjamin R. Tillman (D)
 3. Asbury C. Latimer (D), until February 20, 1908
 Frank B. Gary (D), from March 6, 1908

South Dakota
 2. Robert J. Gamble (R)
 3. Alfred B. Kittredge (R)

Tennessee
 1. James B. Frazier (D)
 2. Robert L. Taylor (D)

Texas
 1. Charles A. Culberson (D)
 2. Joseph W. Bailey (D)

Utah
 1. George Sutherland (R)
 3. Reed Smoot (R)

Vermont
 1. Redfield Proctor (R), until March 4, 1908
 John W. Stewart (R), March 24, 1908 – October 21, 1908
 Carroll S. Page (R), from October 21, 1908
 3. William P. Dillingham (R)

Virginia
 1. John W. Daniel (D)
 2. Thomas S. Martin (D)

Washington
 1. Samuel H. Piles (R)
 3. Levi Ankeny (R)

West Virginia
 1. Nathan B. Scott (R)
 2. Stephen B. Elkins (R)

Wisconsin
 1. Robert M. La Follette Sr. (R)
 3. John C. Spooner (R), until April 30, 1907
 Isaac Stephenson (R), from May 17, 1907

Wyoming
 1. Clarence D. Clark (R)
 2. Francis E. Warren (R)

House of Representatives

The names of members of the House of Representatives elected statewide on the general ticket or otherwise at-large, are preceded by an "At-large," and the names of those elected from districts, whether plural or single member, are preceded by their district numbers.

Alabama
 . George W. Taylor (D)
 . Ariosto A. Wiley (D), until June 17, 1908
 Oliver C. Wiley (D), from November 3, 1908
 . Henry D. Clayton (D)
 . William B. Craig (D)
 . J. Thomas Heflin (D)
 . Richmond P. Hobson (D)
 . John L. Burnett (D)
 . William N. Richardson (D)
 . Oscar Underwood (D)

Arkansas
 . Robert B. Macon (D)
 . Stephen Brundidge Jr. (D)
 . John C. Floyd (D)
 . William B. Cravens (D)
 . Charles C. Reid (D)
 . Joseph Taylor Robinson (D)
 . Robert M. Wallace (D)

California
 . William F. Englebright (R)
 . Duncan E. McKinlay (R)
 . Joseph R. Knowland (R)
 . Julius Kahn (R)
 . Everis A. Hayes (R)
 . James C. Needham (R)
 . James McLachlan (R)
 . Sylvester C. Smith (R)

Colorado
 . Robert W. Bonynge (R)
 . Warren A. Haggott (R)
 . George W. Cook (R)

Connecticut
 . E. Stevens Henry (R)
 . Nehemiah D. Sperry (R)
 . Edwin W. Higgins (R)
 . Ebenezer J. Hill (R)
 . George L. Lilley (R), until January 5, 1909

Delaware
 . Hiram R. Burton (R)

Florida
 . Stephen M. Sparkman (D)
 . Frank Clark (D)
 . William B. Lamar (D)

Georgia
 . Charles G. Edwards (D)
 . James M. Griggs (D)
 . Elijah B. Lewis (D)
 . William C. Adamson (D)
 . Leonidas F. Livingston (D)
 . Charles L. Bartlett (D)
 . Gordon Lee (D)
 . William M. Howard (D)
 . Thomas Montgomery Bell (D)
 . Thomas W. Hardwick (D)
 . William G. Brantley (D)

Idaho
 . Burton L. French (R)

Illinois
 . Martin B. Madden (R)
 . James R. Mann (R)
 . William W. Wilson (R)
 . James T. McDermott (D)
 . Adolph J. Sabath (D)
 . William Lorimer (R)
 . Philip Knopf (R)
 . Charles McGavin (R)
 . Henry S. Boutell (R)
 . George E. Foss (R)
 . Howard M. Snapp (R)
 . Charles Eugene Fuller (R)
 . Frank O. Lowden (R)
 . James McKinney (R)
 . George W. Prince (R)
 . Joseph V. Graff (R)
 . John A. Sterling (R)
 . Joseph G. Cannon (R)
 . William B. McKinley (R)
 . Henry T. Rainey (D)
 . Ben F. Caldwell (D)
 . William A. Rodenberg (R)
 . Martin D. Foster (D)
 . Pleasant T. Chapman (R)
 . George Washington Smith (R), until November 30, 1907
 Napoleon B. Thistlewood (R), from February 15, 1908

Indiana
 . John H. Foster (R)
 . John C. Chaney (R)
 . William E. Cox (D)
 . Lincoln Dixon (D)
 . Elias S. Holliday (R)
 . James E. Watson (R)
 . Jesse Overstreet (R)
 . John A.M. Adair (D)
 . Charles B. Landis (R)
 . Edgar D. Crumpacker (R)
 . George W. Rauch (D)
 . Clarence C. Gilhams (R)
 . Abraham L. Brick (R), until April 7, 1908
 Henry A. Barnhart (D), from November 3, 1908

Iowa
 . Charles A. Kennedy (R)
 . Albert F. Dawson (R)
 . Benjamin P. Birdsall (R)
 . Gilbert N. Haugen (R)
 . Robert G. Cousins (R)
 . Daniel W. Hamilton (D)
 . John A. T. Hull (R)
 . William P. Hepburn (R)
 . Walter I. Smith (R)
 . James P. Conner (R)
 . Elbert H. Hubbard (R)

Kansas
 . Daniel Read Anthony Jr. (R), from May 23, 1907
 . Charles Frederick Scott (R)
 . Philip P. Campbell (R)
 . James Monroe Miller (R)
 . William A. Calderhead (R)
 . William A. Reeder (R)
 . Edmond H. Madison (R)
 . Victor Murdock (R)

Kentucky
 . Ollie M. James (D)
 . Augustus Stanley (D)
 . Addison James (R)
 . Ben Johnson (D)
 . J. Swagar Sherley (D)
 . Joseph L. Rhinock (D)
 . William P. Kimball (D)
 . Harvey Helm (D)
 . Joseph B. Bennett (R)
 . John W. Langley (R)
 . Don C. Edwards (R)

Louisiana
 . Adolph Meyer (D), until March 8, 1908
 Albert Estopinal (D), from November 3, 1908
 . Robert C. Davey (D), until December 26, 1908
 . Robert F. Broussard (D)
 . John Thomas Watkins (D)
 . Joseph E. Ransdell (D)
 . George Kent Favrot (D)
 . Arsène Paulin Pujó (D)

Maine
 . Amos L. Allen (R)
 . Charles E. Littlefield (R), until September 30, 1908
 John P. Swasey (R), from November 3, 1908
 . Edwin C. Burleigh (R)
 . Llewellyn Powers (R), until July 28, 1908
 Frank E. Guernsey (R), from November 3, 1908

Maryland
 . William Humphreys Jackson (R)
 . J. Frederick C. Talbott (D)
 . Harry B. Wolf (D)
 . John Gill Jr. (D)
 . Sydney E. Mudd (R)
 . George A. Pearre (R)

Massachusetts
 . George P. Lawrence (R)
 . Frederick H. Gillett (R)
 . Charles G. Washburn (R)
 . Charles Q. Tirrell (R)
 . Butler Ames (R)
 . Augustus P. Gardner (R)
 . Ernest W. Roberts (R)
 . Samuel W. McCall (R)
 . John A. Keliher (D)
 . Joseph F. O'Connell (D)
 . Andrew J. Peters (D)
 . John W. Weeks (R)
 . William S. Greene (R)
 . William C. Lovering (R)

Michigan
 . Edwin C. Denby (R)
 . Charles E. Townsend (R)
 . Washington Gardner (R)
 . Edward L. Hamilton (R)
 . Gerrit J. Diekema (R), from March 17, 1908
 . Samuel W. Smith (R)
 . Henry McMorran (R)
 . Joseph W. Fordney (R)
 . James C. McLaughlin (R)
 . George A. Loud (R)
 . Archibald B. Darragh (R)
 . H. Olin Young (R)

Minnesota
 . James Albertus Tawney (R)
 . Winfield Scott Hammond (D)
 . Charles Russell Davis (R)
 . Frederick C. Stevens (R)
 . Frank Nye (R)
 . Charles August Lindbergh (R)
 . Andrew Volstead (R)
 . James Bede (R)
 . Halvor Steenerson (R)

Mississippi
 . Ezekiel S. Candler Jr. (D)
 . Thomas Spight (D)
 . Benjamin G. Humphreys II (D)
 . Wilson S. Hill (D)
 . Adam M. Byrd (D)
 . Eaton J. Bowers (D)
 . Frank A. McLain (D)
 . John Sharp Williams (D)

Missouri
 . James T. Lloyd (D)
 . William W. Rucker (D)
 . Joshua Willis Alexander (D)
 . Charles F. Booher (D)
 . Edgar C. Ellis (R)
 . David A. De Armond (D)
 . Courtney W. Hamlin (D)
 . Dorsey W. Shackleford (D)
 . James Beauchamp Clark (D)
 . Richard Bartholdt (R)
 . Henry S. Caulfield (R)
 . Harry M. Coudrey (R)
 . Madison R. Smith (D)
 . Joseph J. Russell (D)
 . Thomas Hackney (D)
 . J. Robert Lamar (D)

Montana
 . Charles N. Pray (R)

Nebraska
 . Ernest M. Pollard (R)
 . Gilbert M. Hitchcock (D)
 . John Frank Boyd (R)
 . Edmund H. Hinshaw (R)
 . George W. Norris (R)
 . Moses P. Kinkaid (R)

Nevada
 . George A. Bartlett (D)

New Hampshire
 . Cyrus Adams Sulloway (R)
 . Frank Dunklee Currier (R)

New Jersey
 . Henry C. Loudenslager (R)
 . John J. Gardner (R)
 . Benjamin F. Howell (R)
 . Ira W. Wood (R)
 . Charles N. Fowler (R)
 . William Hughes (D)
 . Richard Wayne Parker (R)
 . Le Gage Pratt (D)
 . Eugene W. Leake (D)
 . James A. Hamill (D)

New York
 . William W. Cocks (R)
 . George H. Lindsay (D)
 . Charles T. Dunwell (R), until June 12, 1908
 Otto G. Foelker (R), from November 3, 1908
 . Charles B. Law (R)
 . George E. Waldo (R)
 . William M. Calder (R)
 . John J. Fitzgerald (D)
 . Daniel J. Riordan (D)
 . Henry M. Goldfogle (D)
 . William Sulzer (D)
 . Charles V. Fornes (D)
 . W. Bourke Cockran (D)
 . Herbert Parsons (R)
 . William Willett Jr. (D)
 . J. Van Vechten Olcott (R)
 . Francis B. Harrison (D)
 . William S. Bennet (R)
 . Joseph A. Goulden (D)
 . John E. Andrus (R)
 . Thomas W. Bradley (R)
 . Samuel McMillan (R)
 . William H. Draper (R)
 . George N. Southwick (R)
 . George W. Fairchild (R)
 . Cyrus Durey (R)
 . George R. Malby (R)
 . James S. Sherman (R)
 . Charles L. Knapp (R)
 . Michael E. Driscoll (R)
 . John W. Dwight (R)
 . Sereno E. Payne (R)
 . James B. Perkins (R)
 . J. Sloat Fassett (R)
 . Peter A. Porter (R)
 . William H. Ryan (D)
 . De Alva S. Alexander (R)
 . Edward B. Vreeland (R)

North Carolina
 . John Humphrey Small (D)
 . Claude Kitchin (D)
 . Charles R. Thomas (D)
 . Edward W. Pou (D)
 . William W. Kitchin (D), until January 11, 1909
 . Hannibal L. Godwin (D)
 . Robert N. Page (D)
 . Richard N. Hackett (D)
 . Edwin Y. Webb (D)
 . William T. Crawford (D)

North Dakota
 . Thomas Frank Marshall (R)
 . Asle Gronna (R)

Ohio
 . Nicholas Longworth (R)
 . Herman P. Goebel (R)
 . J. Eugene Harding (R)
 . William E. Tou Velle (D)
 . Timothy T. Ansberry (D)
 . Matthew R. Denver (D)
 . J. Warren Keifer (R)
 . Ralph D. Cole (R)
 . Isaac R. Sherwood (D)
 . Henry T. Bannon (R)
 . Albert Douglas (R)
 . Edward L. Taylor Jr. (R)
 . Grant E. Mouser (R)
 . J. Ford Laning (R)
 . Beman G. Dawes (R)
 . Capell L. Weems (R)
 . William A. Ashbrook (D)
 . James Kennedy (R)
 . W. Aubrey Thomas (R)
 . L. Paul Howland (R)
 . Theodore E. Burton (R), until March 3, 1909

Oklahoma
 . Bird Segle McGuire (R), from November 16, 1907
 . Elmer L. Fulton (D), from November 16, 1907
 . James S. Davenport (D), from November 16, 1907
 . Charles D. Carter (D), from November 16, 1907
 . Scott Ferris (D), from November 16, 1907

Oregon
 . Willis C. Hawley (R)
 . William R. Ellis (R)

Pennsylvania
 . Henry H. Bingham (R)
 . John E. Reyburn (R), until March 31, 1907
 Joel Cook (R), from November 5, 1907
 . J. Hampton Moore (R)
 . Reuben O. Moon (R)
 . William W. Foulkrod (R)
 . George D. McCreary (R)
 . Thomas S. Butler (R)
 . Irving P. Wanger (R)
 . Henry B. Cassel (R)
 . Thomas D. Nicholls (ID)
 . John T. Lenahan (D)
 . Charles N. Brumm (R), until January 4, 1909
 . John H. Rothermel (D)
 . George W. Kipp (D)
 . William B. Wilson (D)
 . John G. McHenry (D)
 . Benjamin K. Focht (R)
 . Marlin E. Olmsted (R)
 . John M. Reynolds (R)
 . Daniel F. Lafean (R)
 . Charles F. Barclay (R)
 . George F. Huff (R)
 . Allen F. Cooper (R)
 . Ernest F. Acheson (R)
 . Arthur L. Bates (R)
 . J. Davis Brodhead (D)
 . Joseph G. Beale (R)
 . Nelson P. Wheeler (R)
 . William H. Graham (R)
 . John Dalzell (R)
 . James F. Burke (R)
 . Andrew J. Barchfeld (R)

Rhode Island
 . Daniel L. D. Granger (D), until February 14, 1909
 . Adin B. Capron (R)

South Carolina
 . George S. Legare (D)
 . James O. Patterson (D)
 . Wyatt Aiken (D)
 . Joseph T. Johnson (D)
 . David E. Finley (D)
 . J. Edwin Ellerbe (D)
 . Asbury F. Lever (D)

South Dakota
 . Philo Hall (R)
 . William H. Parker (R), until June 26, 1908
 Eben Martin (R), from November 3, 1908

Tennessee
 . Walter P. Brownlow (R)
 . Nathan W. Hale (R)
 . John A. Moon (D)
 . Cordell Hull (D)
 . William C. Houston (D)
 . John W. Gaines (D)
 . Lemuel P. Padgett (D)
 . Thetus W. Sims (D)
 . Finis J. Garrett (D)
 . George W. Gordon (D)

Texas
 . Morris Sheppard (D)
 . Samuel B. Cooper (D)
 . Gordon J. Russell (D)
 . Choice B. Randell (D)
 . James Andrew Beall (D)
 . Rufus Hardy (D)
 . Alexander W. Gregg (D)
 . John M. Moore (D)
 . George Farmer Burgess (D)
 . Albert S. Burleson (D)
 . Robert L. Henry (D)
 . Oscar W. Gillespie (D)
 . John H. Stephens (D)
 . James L. Slayden (D)
 . John Nance Garner (D)
 . William R. Smith (D)

Utah
 . Joseph Howell (R)

Vermont
 . David J. Foster (R)
 . Kittredge Haskins (R)

Virginia
 . William A. Jones (D)
 . Harry L. Maynard (D)
 . John Lamb (D)
 . Francis R. Lassiter (D)
 . Edward W. Saunders (D)
 . Carter Glass (D)
 . James Hay (D)
 . Charles Creighton Carlin (D), from November 5, 1907
 . Campbell Slemp (R), until October 13, 1907
 C. Bascom Slemp (R), from December 17, 1907
 . Henry D. Flood (D)

Washington
 . Wesley Livsey Jones (R)
 . Francis W. Cushman (R)
 . William E. Humphrey (R)

West Virginia
 . William P. Hubbard (R)
 . George Cookman Sturgiss (R)
 . Joseph Holt Gaines (R)
 . Harry C. Woodyard (R)
 . James Anthony Hughes (R)

Wisconsin
 . Henry Allen Cooper (R)
 . John M. Nelson (R)
 . James William Murphy (D)
 . William J. Cary (R)
 . William H. Stafford (R)
 . Charles H. Weisse (D)
 . John J. Esch (R)
 . James H. Davidson (R)
 . Gustav Küstermann (R)
 . Elmer A. Morse (R)
 . John J. Jenkins (R)

Wyoming
 . Franklin W. Mondell (R)

Non-voting members
 . Thomas Cale (I)
 . Marcus Aurelius Smith (D)
 . Jonah Kunio Kalanianaole (R)
 . William Henry Andrews (R)
 . Benito Legarda y Tuason (Fed., R), from November 22, 1907
 . Pablo Ocampo (D), from November 22, 1907
 . Tulio Larrínaga (Resident Commissioner) (Unionist)

Changes in membership
The count below reflects changes from the beginning of the first session of this Congress.

Senate
 Replacements: 10
 Democratic: no net change
 Republican: no net change
 Deaths: 8
 Resignations: 1
 Vacancy: 1
 Total seats with changes:  11

House of Representatives
 Replacements: 13
 Democratic: 4 seat gain
 Republican: 2 seat loss
 Deaths: 10
 Resignations: 7
 Contested elections: 0
 New seats: 7
 Total seats with changes: 20

Committees

Senate

 Additional Accommodations for the Library of Congress (Select) (Chairman: Thomas S. Martin) 
 Agriculture and Forestry (Chairman: Redfield Proctor; Ranking Member: Hernando D. Money)
 Appropriations (Chairman: William B. Allison; Ranking Member: Henry M. Teller)
 Audit and Control the Contingent Expenses of the Senate (Chairman: John Kean; Ranking Member: Hernando D. Money)
 Canadian Relations (Chairman: Winthrop Murray Crane; Ranking Member: Benjamin R. Tillman)
 Census (Chairman: Chester I. Long; Ranking Member: Samuel D. McEnery)
 Civil Service and Retrenchment (Chairman: George C. Perkins; Ranking Member: Anselm J. McLaurin)
 Claims (Chairman: Charles W. Fulton; Ranking Member: Thomas S. Martin)
 Coast and Insular Survey (Chairman: Samuel H. Piles; Ranking Member: Alexander S. Clay)
 Coast Defenses (Chairman: George S. Nixon; Ranking Member: Charles A. Culberson)
 Commerce (Chairman: William P. Frye; Ranking Member: N/A)
 Corporations Organized in the District of Columbia (Chairman: Samuel D. McEnery; Ranking Member: Nelson W. Aldrich)
 Cuban Relations (Chairman: Henry E. Burnham; Ranking Member: Henry M. Teller)
 Distributing Public Revenue Among the States (Select) (Chairman: Hernando D. Money)
 District of Columbia (Chairman: Jacob H. Gallinger; Ranking Member: Thomas S. Martin)
 Education and Labor (Chairman: Jonathan P. Dolliver; Ranking Member: John W. Daniel)
 Engrossed Bills (Chairman: Augustus O. Bacon; Ranking Member: Alfred B. Kittredge)
 Enrolled Bills (Chairman: Albert J. Hopkins; Ranking Member: Murphy J. Foster)
 Establish a University in the United States (Select) (Chairman: James A. Hemenway; Ranking Member: Charles A. Culberson)
 Examination of Disposition of Documents (Select)
 Examine the Several Branches in the Civil Service (Chairman: Joseph M. Dixon; Ranking Member: John W. Daniel)
 Expenditures in the Department of Agriculture (Select) (Chairman: Isaac Stephenson; Ranking Member: Furnifold M. Simmons)
 Expenditures in Executive Departments (Chairman: Hernando D. Money; Ranking Member: Jacob H. Gallinger)
 Expenditures in the Interior Department (Select) (Chairman: Harry A. Richardson; Ranking Member: James B. McCreary)
 Expenditures in the Department of Justice (Select) (Chairman: Norris Brown; Ranking Member: Joseph W. Bailey)
 Expenditures in the Navy Department (Select) (Chairman: Simon Guggenheim; Ranking Member: Thomas S. Martin then Benjamin R. Tillman)
 Expenditures in the Treasury Department (Select) (Chairman: Frank O. Briggs; Ranking Member: William Pinkney Whyte then James P. Clarke)
 Expenditures in the War Department (Select) (Chairman: Benjamin R. Tillman; Ranking Member: Hernando D. Money then Murphy J. Foster Jr.)
 Finance (Chairman: Nelson W. Aldrich; Ranking Member: John W. Daniel)
 Fisheries (Chairman: Jonathan Bourne Jr.; Ranking Member: Stephen R. Mallory then Samuel D. McEnery)
 Five Civilized Tribes of Indians (Select) (Chairman: Benjamin R. Tillman; Ranking Member: Alfred B. Kittredge)
 Foreign Relations (Chairman: Shelby M. Cullom; Ranking Member: Augustus O. Bacon)
 Forest Reservations and the Protection of Game (Chairman: Frank B. Brandegee; Ranking Member: Benjamin R. Tillman)
 Geological Survey (Chairman: Frank P. Flint; Ranking Member: Hernando D. Money)
 Immigration (Chairman: William P. Dillingham; Ranking Member: Anselm J. McLaurin)
 Indian Affairs (Chairman: Moses E. Clapp; Ranking Member: William J. Stone)
 Indian Depredations (Chairman: Moses E. Clapp; Ranking Member: Thomas S. Martin)
 Industrial Expositions (Chairman: William Warner; Ranking Member: John W. Daniel)
 Interoceanic Canals (Chairman: Alfred B. Kittredge; Ranking Member: James P. Taliaferro)
 Interstate Commerce (Chairman: Stephen B. Elkins; Ranking Member: Benjamin R. Tillman)
 Investigate the Condition of the Potomac River Front at Washington (Select) (Chairman: Joseph H. Millard; Ranking Member: Thomas S. Martin)
 Irrigation (Chairman: Levi Ankeny; Ranking Member: Joseph W. Bailey)
 Judiciary (Chairman: Clarence D. Clark; Ranking Member: Augustus O. Bacon)
 Library (Chairman: N/A; Ranking Member: John W. Daniel)
 Manufactures (Chairman: Weldon B. Heyburn; Ranking Member: Alexander S. Clay)
 Military Affairs (Chairman: Francis E. Warren; Ranking Member: James P. Taliaferro)
 Mines and Mining (Chairman: Charles Dick; Ranking Member: Benjamin R. Tillman)
 Mississippi River and its Tributaries (Select) (Chairman: Knute Nelson; Ranking Member: Samuel D. McEnery)
 National Banks (Select) (Chairman: William A. Smith)
 Naval Affairs (Chairman: Eugene Hale; Ranking Member: Anselm J. McLaurin)
 Organization, Conduct and Expenditures of the Executive Departments (Chairman: Thomas H. Carter; Ranking Member: Anselm J. McLaurin) 
 Pacific Islands and Puerto Rico (Chairman: Joseph B. Foraker; Ranking Member: N/A)
 Pacific Railroads (Chairman: Elmer J. Burkett; Ranking Member: James P. Taliaferro)
 Patents (Chairman: Reed Smoot; Ranking Member: N/A)
 Pensions (Chairman: Porter J. McCumber; Ranking Member: James P. Taliaferro)
 Philippines (Chairman: Henry Cabot Lodge; Ranking Member: Charles A. Culberson)
 Post Office and Post Roads (Chairman: Boies Penrose; Ranking Member: Alexander S. Clay)
 Potomac River Front (Select) 
 Printing (Chairman: Thomas C. Platt; Ranking Member: William Pinkney Whyte)
 Private Land Claims (Chairman: Henry M. Teller; Ranking Member: Eugene Hale)
 Privileges and Elections (Chairman: Julius C. Burrows; Ranking Member: Josiah W. Bailey)
 Public Buildings and Grounds (Chairman: Nathan B. Scott; Ranking Member: Charles A. Culberson)
 Public Health and National Quarantine (Chairman: John W. Daniel; Ranking Member: Chauncey M. Depew)
 Public Lands (Chairman: Henry C. Hansbrough; Ranking Member: Samuel D. McEnery)
 Railroads (Chairman: Morgan G. Bulkeley; Ranking Member: Augustus O. Bacon)
 Revision of the Laws (Chairman: Chauncey M. Depew; Ranking Member: John W. Daniel)
 Revolutionary Claims (Chairman: James P. Taliaferro; Ranking Member: William A. Smith)
 Rules (Chairman: Philander C. Knox; Ranking Member: Augustus O. Bacon)
 Standards, Weights and Measures (Select) (Chairman: William E. Borah; Ranking Member: James B. McCreary)
 Tariff Regulation (Select)
 Territories (Chairman: Albert J. Beveridge; Ranking Member: James P. Clarke)
 Transportation and Sale of Meat Products (Select) (Chairman: Samuel D. McEnery; Ranking Member: Charles A. Culberson)
 Transportation Routes to the Seaboard (Chairman: Robert J. Gamble; Ranking Member: John W. Daniel)
 Trespassers upon Indian Lands (Select) (Chairman: George Sutherland; Ranking Member: Clarence D. Clark)
 Ventilation and Acoustics (Select)
 Whole
 Woman Suffrage (Select) (Chairman: Alexander S. Clay; Ranking Member: N/A)

House of Representatives

 Accounts (Chairman: James A. Hughes; Ranking Member: Charles L. Bartlett)
 Agriculture (Chairman: Charles Frederick Scott; Ranking Member: John Lamb)
 Alcoholic Liquor Traffic (Chairman: Nehemiah D. Sperry; Ranking Member: N/A)
 Appropriations (Chairman: James A. Tawney; Ranking Member: Leonidas Livingston)
 Banking and Currency (Chairman: Charles N. Fowler; Ranking Member: Elijah B. Lewis)
 Bills and Resolutions Introduced in the House (Select)
 Census (Chairman: Edgar D. Crumpacker; Ranking Member: James Hay)
 Claims (Chairman: James M. Miller; Ranking Member: Henry M. Goldfogle)
 Coinage, Weights and Measures (Chairman: William B. McKinley; Ranking Member: John W. Gaines)
 Disposition of Executive Papers (Chairman: Arthur L. Bates; Ranking Member: Joshua Frederick Cockey Talbott)
 District of Columbia (Chairman: Samuel W. Smith; Ranking Member: Thetus W. Sims)
 Education (Chairman: George N. Southwick; Ranking Member: Asbury F. Lever)
 Election of the President, Vice President and Representatives in Congress (Chairman: Joseph H. Gaines; Ranking Member: William W. Rucker)
 Elections No.#1 (Chairman: James R. Mann; Ranking Member: Ollie M. James)
 Elections No.#2 (Chairman: Marlin E. Olmsted; Ranking Member: Adam M. Byrd)
 Elections No.#3 (Chairman: Michael E. Driscoll; Ranking Member: Claude Kitchin)
 Enrolled Bills (Chairman: William W. Wilson; Ranking Member: Henry Thomas Rainey)
 Expenditures in the Agriculture Department (Chairman: Charles E. Littlefield; Ranking Member: Henry D. Flood)
 Expenditures in the Commerce and Labor Departments (Chairman: David J. Foster; Ranking Member: Arsene Pujo)
 Expenditures in the Interior Department (Chairman: Sydney E. Mudd; Ranking Member: Henry M. Goldfogle)
 Expenditures in the Justice Department (Chairman: Gilbert N. Haugen; Ranking Member: Robert N. Page)
 Expenditures in the Navy Department (Chairman: Henry S. Boutell; Ranking Member: Lemuel P. Padgett)
 Expenditures in the Post Office Department (Chairman: Irving P. Wanger; Ranking Member: Carter Glass)
 Expenditures in the State Department (Chairman: John W. Weeks; Ranking Member: Samuel B. Cooper)
 Expenditures in the Treasury Department (Chairman: Philip Knopf; Ranking Member: John Lamb)
 Expenditures in the War Department (Chairman: George P. Lawrence; Ranking Member: Joseph L. Rhinock)
 Expenditures on Public Buildings (Chairman: E. Stevens Henry; Ranking Member: John H. Small)
 Foreign Affairs (Chairman: Robert G. Cousins; Ranking Member: William M. Howard)
 Immigration and Naturalization (Chairman: Benjamin F. Howell; Ranking Member: John L. Burnett)
 Indian Affairs (Chairman: James S. Sherman; Ranking Member: John H. Stephens)
 Industrial Arts and Expositions (Chairman: Augustus P. Gardner; Ranking Member: Harry L. Maynard)
 Insular Affairs (Chairman: Henry Allen Cooper; Ranking Member: William A. Jones)
 Interstate and Foreign Commerce (Chairman: William P. Hepburn; Ranking Member: Robert C. Davey)
 Invalid Pensions (Chairman: Cyrus A. Sulloway; Ranking Member: George H. Lindsay)
 Irrigation of Arid Lands (Chairman: William A. Reeder; Ranking Member: William R. Smith)
 Judiciary (Chairman: John J. Jenkins; Ranking Member: David A. De Armond) 
 Labor (Chairman: John J. Gardner; Ranking Member: Henry Thomas Rainey)
 Levees and Improvements of the Mississippi River (Chairman: George W. Prince; Ranking Member: Robert F. Broussard)
 Library (Chairman: Samuel W. McCall; Ranking Member: William M. Howard)
 Manufactures (Chairman: Henry McMorran; Ranking Member: Charles H. Weisse)
 Merchant Marine and Fisheries (Chairman: William S. Greene; Ranking Member: Thomas Spight)
 Mileage (Chairman: Charles N. Brumm; Ranking Member: Elijah B. Lewis)
 Military Affairs (Chairman: John A.T. Hull; Ranking Member: William Sulzer)
 Militia (Chairman: Halvor Steenerson; Ranking Member: Ariosto A. Wiley)
 Mines and Mining (Chairman: George F. Huff; Ranking Member: Gordon Lee)
 Naval Affairs (Chairman: George E. Foss; Ranking Member: Adolph Meyer)
 Pacific Railroads (Chairman: Thomas S. Butler; Ranking Member: James L. Slayden)
 Patents (Chairman: Frank D. Currier; Ranking Member: William Sulzer)
 Pensions (Chairman: Henry C. Loudenslager; Ranking Member: William Richardson)
 Post Office and Post Roads (Chairman: Jesse Overstreet; Ranking Member: John A. Moon)
 Printing (Chairman: Charles B. Landis; Ranking Member: David E. Finley)
 Private Land Claims (Chairman: Thomas F. Marshall; Ranking Member: William A. Jones)
 Public Buildings and Grounds (Chairman: Richard Bartholdt; Ranking Member: William G. Brantley)
 Public Lands (Chairman: Frank W. Mondell; Ranking Member: John W. Gaines)
 Railways and Canals (Chairman: James H. Davidson; Ranking Member: James O. Patterson)
 Reform in the Civil Service (Chairman: Frederick H. Gillett; Ranking Member: William P. Kimball)
 Revision of Laws (Chairman: Reuben O. Moon; Ranking Member: Robert B. Macon)
 Rivers and Harbors (Chairman: Theodore E. Burton; Ranking Member: Stephen M. Sparkman)
 Rules (Chairman: John Dalzell; Ranking Member: John S. Williams) 
 Standards of Official Conduct
 Territories (Chairman: Edward L. Hamilton; Ranking Member: James T. Lloyd)
 Ventilation and Acoustics (Chairman: William H. Graham; Ranking Member: N/A)
 War Claims (Chairman: Kittredge Haskins; Ranking Member: Thetus W. Sims)
 Ways and Means (Chairman: Sereno E. Payne; Ranking Member: Champ Clark)
 Whole

Joint committees

 Conditions of Indian Tribes (Special)
 Disposition of (Useless) Executive Papers
 The Library
 Printing

Caucuses
 Democratic (House)
 Democratic (Senate)

Employees

Legislative branch agency directors
 Architect of the Capitol: Elliott Woods
 Librarian of Congress: Herbert Putnam 
 Public Printer of the United States: Charles A. Stillings, until 1908 
 John S. Leech, 1908
 Samuel B. Donnelly, from 1908

Senate
 Secretary: Charles G. Bennett 
 Sergeant at Arms: Daniel M. Ransdell 
 Librarian: Edward C. Goodwin
 Chaplain: Edward E. Hale, Unitarian

House of Representatives
 Clerk: Alexander McDowell
 Sergeant at Arms: Henry Casson
 Doorkeeper: Frank B. Lyon
 Postmaster: Samuel Langum, elected December 2, 1907
 Reading Clerks: E.L. Sampson (D) and Dennis E. Alward (R)
 Clerk at the Speaker's Table: Asher C. Hinds
 Chaplain: Henry N. Couden, Universalist

See also 
 1906 United States elections (elections leading to this Congress)
 1906–07 United States Senate elections
 1906 United States House of Representatives elections
 1908 United States elections (elections during this Congress, leading to the next Congress)
 1908 United States presidential election
 1908–09 United States Senate elections
 1908 United States House of Representatives elections

References